NA-219 Hyderabad-I is a constituency for the National Assembly of Pakistan.

Members of Parliament

2018-2022: NA-225 Hyderabad-I

Election 2002 

General elections were held on 10 Oct 2002. Syed Amir Ali Shah Jamote of PPP won by 44,899 votes.

Election 2008 

General elections were held on 18 Feb 2008. Syed Amir Ali Shah Jamote of PPP won by 102,737 votes.

Election 2013 

General elections were held on 11 May 2013. Syed Amir Ali Shah Jamote of PPP won by 59,821 votes and became the  member of National Assembly.

Election 2018 

General elections were held on 25 July 2018.

See also
NA-218 Tando Allahyar
NA-220 Hyderabad-II

References

External links 
Election result's official website

NA-221